Patiala Dreamz is a Punjabi-language film starring Sarwar Ahuja and Madalasa Sharma.

Cast
 Sarwar Ahuja as Garry
 Madalasa Sharma as Reet
 Sardar Sohi as Teja Singh
 Usha Bachani as Jageer kaur
 Amita Nangia as Reets Mother
 Amrit pal Singh - Billa Bhajji as Major Sandhu

Production
The Times of India reported that Patiala Dreamz is Parminder Kapoor's first film. The Royal Patiala reported that the movie was made with a star cast of Sarwar Ahuja (winner of ZeeCine Star ki Khoj), Madalsa Sharma, comedy king BN Sharma, versatile actor Sardar Sohi, Preeto Sawhney, Maninder Velly, Rana Jang Bahadar, Amita Nangia, Amritpal Billa Bhajji, Kuwinder Billa and many more. The movie's actors are mostly from Patiala as are the producers. The songs were recorded by Punjabi and Bollywood singers. The shooting of the movie has just finished, and inside news is that movie will be ready for release for upcoming holiday season near Diwali. According to the Calgary Herald, the Alberta-shot Bollywood film delayed by flooding is back on track.

References

External links
 

2014 films
Punjabi-language Indian films